Mihailo Janković was a Yugoslav architect who designed a few of the important structures in Serbia whilst a part of Yugoslavia.

He designed "The stadium JNA" - now known as Partizan Stadium (1951), building of SIV (1961) and Museum of May 25. His most important project was skyscraper CK (1961) now known as Ušće Tower.

Mihailo Janković died in 1976.

References 

1911 births
1976 deaths
Architects from Belgrade
Yugoslav architects
Brutalist architects
Postmodern architects
Socialist realist artists